Murnungin is a locality in Victoria, Australia, located approximately 49 km from Swan Hill, Victoria.

References

Towns in Victoria (Australia)
Rural City of Swan Hill